The Back to Me Tour was the first headlining concert tour by American recording artist Fantasia Barrino. Primarily visiting the United States, the tour supported her third studio album, Back to Me. 

Previously, Barrino toured with Kanye West on his Touch the Sky Tour in 2005. Barrino also toured alongside Jamie Foxx on his "Unpredictable Tour" in 2006 and the "American Idols LIVE! Tour 2004" in 2004.

Background
After the success of Barrino's third album, she embarked on a promotional tour of England to promote the record. The tour was announced September 28, 2010, on Barrino's official website. The tour followed the turbulent events of the summer, when she attempted suicide (documented on her television series Fantasia for Real), and an abortion. Despite the events, Barrino remarked her excitement for touring, as a way to focus on her music and connect with her fans. 

To introduce the tour, Barrino stated, "I'm so excited about this tour and having the chance to connect with my fans, the people that love me and have been supporting me through everything. This tour is going to be a real special, intimate experience for them and for me." 

Barrino mentioned that videos posted on YouTube inspired the concept behind the tour. She said that after her personal ordeals, she watched the music performances of Cab Calloway, Ann Peebles, Tina Turner, James Brown, Stevie Wonder and Freddie Mercury.

Speaking on the tour, Barrino stated:"[This is] not a concert, this is a show. There's a storyline, there's a message in the show that I have. There are moments where I go  changes. In music there's purity, there's honesty, there are feelings from all these artists who go through some of the same things. They're singing about experience, heartache and pain, singing whatever it is that they’re going through."

Opening acts
Eric Benét
Kandi Burruss (select dates)
El DeBarge (select dates)

Setlist
"Instrumental Sequence" 
"Truth Is" / "Ain't Gon' Beg You" / "Selfish (I Want U 2 Myself)"
"Free Yourself"
"Man of the House"
"I'm Doin' Me"
"Trust Him"
"Collard Greens & Cornbread"
"I Can't Stand the Rain" / "I Don't Know Why" / "Kiss"
"The Thrill Is Gone"
"Come Together"
"Move on Me"
"Teach Me"
"Who's Been Lovin' You"
"When I See U"
"Bittersweet"
"Even Angels" / "Theme from Mahogany (Do You Know Where You're Going To)"
"I'm Here"
"Falling in Love Tonight"
"Back to Life"

Tour dates

Cancellations and rescheduled shows

Box office score data

References

2010 concert tours
2011 concert tours
Fantasia Barrino concert tours